Robert Blennerhassett may refer to:

Robert Blennerhassett (1652–1712), Anglo-Irish lawyer and MP
Robert Blennerhassett (MP for Tralee) (c. 1622 – c. 1689), Anglo-Irish soldier and MP